Elaphidion tectum is a species of beetle in the family Cerambycidae. It was described by John Lawrence LeConte in 1878.

References

tectum
Beetles described in 1878